This is a complete list of players to have represented the Fitzroy Football Club in the Victorian/Australian Football League.

Players are listed by the date of their VFL/AFL debut with the club. In cases of players debuting in the same game, they are listed alphabetically.

1890s

1900s

1910s

1920s

1930s

1940s

1950s

1960s

1970s

1980s

1990s

References

External links
Alltime Fitzroy player list

Fitzroy

Fitzroy Football Club players